North Strathfield railway station is located on the Main Northern line, serving the Sydney suburb of North Strathfield. It is served by Sydney Trains T9 Northern Line services.

History
North Strathfield station opened on 9 June 1918 as an island platform with two faces. In 1924, a third platform was added on the western side. It is the first station on the Main Northern line after it branches from the Main Suburban line at Strathfield.

Although the primary, eastern, connection between the Main Northern and Main Suburban lines is from North Strathfield and Strathfield, a secondary, western, connection exists between North Strathfield and Homebush. This connection is mainly used by freight trains but is occasionally used by passenger trains travelling to Olympic Park station during trackwork or for major events at Sydney Olympic Park.

To the east of the station lies a passing loop. This had been taken out of use, but in June 2015 was recommissioned as part of the construction of a dive south of the station as part of the Northern Sydney Freight Corridor project.

As part of the proposed Sydney Metro West project, a further two platforms will be built.

The station was upgraded and given lifts in November 2019.

Platforms and services

References

External links

North Strathfield station details Transport for New South Wales
North Strathfield station Sydney Metro

Easy Access railway stations in Sydney
Main North railway line, New South Wales
Railway stations in Sydney
Railway stations in Australia opened in 1918
City of Canada Bay